Ninni Holmqvist, born 24 June 1958 in Lund and currently living in Scania, Sweden, is a translator and author of fiction. She has published two novels and two collections of short stories since 1995. Her novel The Unit, (Other Press) a dystopian novel published in 2006 and translated from Swedish into English by Marlaine Delargy with its paperback publication in 2009. The Unit has received critical attention both from major literary reviews  and analysis in academic journals.

Bibliography

The suit (Kostym) 1995
Something of a lasting nature  (Något av bestående karaktär) 1999
Supporting Roles (Biroller) 2002
Black Diamonds (Svarta diamanter: elva berättelser om liv och död) 2004
The Unit (Enhet) Translated into English and published in 2009. Initially published in 2006.

References

External links
Other Press author page
Washington Post review of The Unit

1958 births
Living people
People from Lund
Swedish women novelists
Writers from Scania
Swedish women short story writers
Swedish short story writers
20th-century Swedish novelists
21st-century Swedish writers
20th-century Swedish women writers
21st-century Swedish women writers
Swedish translators
20th-century short story writers
21st-century short story writers